The Archdeacon of Bangor is the priest in charge of the archdeaconry of Bangor, an administrative division of the Church in Wales Diocese of Bangor. In 1844, the Archdeaconry of Bangor was combined with the Archdeaconry of Anglesey to form the Archdeaconry of Bangor and Anglesey. The archdeaconry comprises the seven deaneries of Archlechwedd, Arfon, Llifon/Talybolion, Malltraeth, Ogwen, Tyndaethwy and Twrcelyn.

In 2018, the Archdeaconry was separated in diocesan boundary changes, with half becoming the new Archdeaconry of Anglesey, thus recreating the pre-1844 structure.

The current incumbent is Mary Stallard, who became — additionally — Assistant Bishop of Bangor in 2022.

List of archdeacons of Bangor
 1132 Maurice
 1145 Simon
 1157 David (II)
 1166 Alexander Llywelyn
 1236 Richard (also Bishop of Bangor, 1236)
 1248 David (II)
 1284 K.
 1291 Caducan
 1324 Griffin Tudor
 1328 William
 1345 Ithel ap Cynwraig
 1345 Elias
 1367 Gervase ap Madog
 1394 Robert de Higham
 1398 Walter de Swaffham
 1399 Iorweth ap Madog
 1411 Thomas ap Rhys
 1412 John de Carnyn
 1417 Thomas ap Rhys
 1431–1433 Thomas Banastre
 1433 John Heygate
 1436 Thomas Banastre
 1453 John Parsons
 1504–1525 Maurice Glynne
 1525–1556 Thomas Runcorn
 1556 Edward Gregory
 1560 Edmund Meyrick
 1606 Edmund Griffith
 1613 Richard Gwynn
 1617 Edward Hughes
 1633 William Mostyn
 1669 Held by the Bishop
 1685 Annexed to the Bishopric

List of the Archdeacons of Bangor and Anglesey since 1844:

 1844-1863: John Jones (deceased)
 1863-1887: John Wynne Jones
 1887-1902: John Pryce (afterwards Dean of Bangor, 1902)
 1902-1920: John Morgan
 1921-1937: Albert Owen Evans (deceased)
 1937-1947: Harry Morgan (deceased)
 1947-1956: Richard Hughes
 1957-1962: Gwynfryn Richards (afterwards Dean of Bangor, 1962)
 1962-1973: Gilbert Wright
 1973-1983: Hugh Arfon Evans
 1983-1986: Thomas Bayley Hughes
 1986–1999: Elwyn Roberts
 2000-2004: Alun Hawkins (afterwards Dean of Bangor, 2005)
 2005-2011: Meurig Williams
 2012-2017: Paul Davies
 6 May 2018present Mary Stallard (also Assistant Bishop of Bangor since 2022)

References

 
Bangor, Gwynedd